Claudia Jessie (born 1989/1990) is an English actress. She is known for her roles in the third series of the BBC One police procedural WPC 56 (2015) and as Eloise, the fifth Bridgerton child, in the Netflix period drama Bridgerton (2020–present). She also had roles in series 4 of Line of Duty (2017), the Dave sitcom Porters (2017–2019) and the ITV miniseries Vanity Fair (2018).

Early life 
Jessie was born in Moseley, and grew up on a canal boat. She spent some of her childhood in London and was homeschooled from the age of 14 before returning to Birmingham when she was 17. Her family struggled financially; Jessie described the experiences that came with it, such as bailiffs coming to the door, as traumatic. In addition, her parents split and her father was not around. Her single mother, Dawn, worked cleaning houses to provide for her and her brother.

Jessie's mother also worked to afford her ballet lessons at the Challis School of Dance. She was subsequently discovered by student director Hannah Phillips who cast her in several amateur productions. Jessie trained part-time at the Susi Earnshaw Theatre School and spent a year studying with the Birmingham Library Theatre Company. She then signed with an agent in 2012.

Career

Early work (2012–2016) 
Jessie's first professional acting role was in a short film titled Rosie in 2012. She followed this with appearances in the soap operas Doctors and Casualty. She appeared in an episode of House of Anubis, and reprised her role as Sophie Danae in the television film Touchstone of Ra.

Between 2014 and 2016, Jessie starred in the BAFTA-winning CBBC Online web series Dixi as Shari. In 2015, she was cast as WPC Annie Taylor, the lead character in the third series of the BBC One television programme WPC 56. She was a guest in Josh, playing the protagonist’s love interest. Jessie acted in the 2014 short film Copy That directed by Kingsley Hoskins which won the Best Comedic Short Film award at TSFA in New York. Jessie made her feature film debut as Doris in the 2016 war film Their Finest.

Breakthrough (2017–present) 
In 2017, she starred as DC Jodie Taylor in series four of Line of Duty on BBC One and Lucy in the Dave sitcom Porters, the latter of which she would return to for its second series. The following year, she played Amelia Sedley in the ITV miniseries adaptation of William Makepeace Thackeray's Vanity Fair. She also made a guest appearance in the Doctor Who episode "Kerblam!" in 2018.

In 2020, Jessie began playing Eloise, the fifth Bridgerton child, in the Shondaland-produced Netflix period drama Bridgerton, an adaptation of the Regency romance novels by Julia Quinn. Jessie appeared in Bali 2002 for Stan and 9Network, an Australian drama about the real life 2002 Bali bombings. Jessie played real-life survivor Polly Miller, a newlywed British tourist.

Personal life
Jessie spoke of having a boyfriend in 2015. She has stated she is a vegan and meditates for at least an hour a day. Her aunt introduced her to Nichiren Buddhism, and Jessie has regularly practiced it since she was 17 for her mental health. She has spoken of her experiences with panic attacks and anxiety since childhood, as well as depersonalisation disorder.

Filmography

Film

Television

Web

Audio

Awards and nominations

References

External links
 
 Claudia Jessie at Spotlight

Living people
1989 births
21st-century English actresses
Actresses from Birmingham, West Midlands
English Buddhists
English film actresses
English television actresses
Members of Sōka Gakkai
Nichiren Buddhists
People educated at Susi Earnshaw Theatre School
People from Moseley